Pogonoschema is a genus of beetles in the family Carabidae, containing the following species:

 Pogonoschema pallipes Moore, 1972
 Pogonoschema robustius Lorenz, 1998
 Pogonoschema sloanei Jeannel, 1927
 Pogonoschema solidum Moore, 1972

References

Trechinae